Hailee Steinfeld is an American actress, singer and model who has received numerous awards and nominations. Her most major ones include nominations for an Academy Award, a BAFTA Award, a Golden Globe Award and a SAG Award.

After starring in multiple short films, Steinfeld's breakout role came in the acclaimed Coen brothers film, True Grit. For her performance she received critical acclaim and an Academy Award for Best Supporting Actress nomination, making her the ninth youngest nominee in the category. She also received nominations for a BAFTA Award for Best Actress, a SAG Award and a Critics' Choice Movie Award for Best Supporting Actress, as well as winning a Chicago Film Critics Association Award, a Houston Film Critics Society Award and a Critics' Choice Movie Award for Best Young Performer.

Steinfeld also gained recognition for her performances in The Homesman (2014) and Pitch Perfect 2 (2015). The former earned her a nomination for the Women Film Critics Circle award for Best Ensemble, whilst the latter garnered her a Teen Choice Award nomination. The following year, Steinfeld starred in the teen drama film, The Edge of Seventeen (2016), for which she received a nomination for the Golden Globe Award for Best Actress – Motion Picture Comedy or Musical, as well as nomination for two Critics' Choice Awards. For her performance in Bumblebee she was nominated for a Saturn Award, and for her voice work in Spider-Man: Into the Spider-Verse she was nominated for the Alliance of Women Film Journalists award for best animated female. In 2019, Steinfeld received a Peabody Award for Entertainment for her work in the Apple TV+ television series Dickinson.

Major associations

Academy Awards
The Academy Awards are a set of awards given by the Academy of Motion Picture Arts and Sciences annually for excellence of cinematic achievements.

British Academy Film and Television Arts Awards
The BAFTA Award is an annual award show presented by the British Academy of Film and Television Arts.

Critics' Choice Awards
The Critics' Choice Awards are presented annually by the BFCA for outstanding achievements in the cinema, documentary and TV industries.

Golden Globe Awards
The Golden Globe Award is an accolade bestowed by the 93 members of the Hollywood Foreign Press Association (HFPA) recognizing excellence in film and television, both domestic and foreign.

Screen Actors Guild Awards
The Screen Actors Guild Awards are organized by the Screen Actors Guild‐American Federation of Television and Radio Artists. First awarded in 1995, the awards aim to recognize excellent achievements by actors in film and television.

Miscellaneous awards

Critics associations

Noteslist

References

Hailee Steinfeld
Steinfeld, Hailee
Steinfeld, Hailee